Chuck Sabo is an American drummer, musical director, songwriter, and producer who has performed and recorded with prominent artists including XTC, Natalie Imbruglia, Elton John, Tom Jones, Chaka Khan, Bryan Adams, Cher, Tina Turner, Pet Shop Boys, Billy Preston, Roy Orbison, Terence Trent D'Arby, Seal, Right Said Fred, Shakespear's Sister, Take That, OMD, 808 State, Tashan, Belinda Carlisle, Kiki Dee, Étienne Daho, and Michel Polnareff.

Early life

Chuck Sabo (Charles Edward Sabo Jr.) was born August 22, 1958, and grew up in Allentown, Pennsylvania, in a family of non-musicians. His parents supported his interest in and aptitude for playing the drums, and he began his career playing in cover bands in the Allentown area.

Career

1980s
Sabo moved to New York City in 1980 at age 21. While taking drum lessons with Sonny Igoe he worked moving furniture to subsidize his music career. In the early part of the decade he made his first significant industry connections, recording his first major label project (1982's The Eleventh Hour) with Tom Dickie and the Desires managed by Tommy Mottola.

He also played in the early 1980s in New York City with the Comateens, and his stint in NYC ended after he recorded their final album, Deal With It, in 1984. After touring Europe with the group to support the album, he decided to stay in London.

He began his UK career being offered gigs with two bands, Decadence, managed by Mick Rossey, who was also managing Flock of Seagulls, and Glasgow band Talking Drums, who were managed by Miles Copeland. He went with Talking Drums and moved to Glasgow for a short time, but soon returned to London, where he played with a number of bands and became further known on the music scene.

In 1988 he was the session drummer for Étienne Daho's album Pour Nos Vies Martiennes. The following year he toured Europe with Daho.

1990s

Sabo played on Martyn Ware's 1991 British Electric Foundation album Music of Quality and Distinction, Vol. 2, which included recordings with Tina Turner, Chaka Khan, Terence Trent D'Arby, Billy Preston, and others. In 1992 he played on Tashan's 1992 album For the Sake of Love, produced by Ware. He toured with Shakespears Sister and played on their album Hormonally Yours as well as Right Said Fred's album Up. In 1993 he was the session drummer on Take That's album Everything Changes.

In 1994, while he was recording Marcella Detroit's album Jewel, its producer Chris Thomas arranged for Sabo to play on the last track ("Duets for One") on Elton John's Duets album. That led to sessions for The Lion King soundtrack, where Sabo played on "Circle of Life," "Can You Feel the Love Tonight," and "I Just Can't Wait to Be King." Sessions with Kiki Dee and Orchestral Manoeuvres in the Dark (OMD) followed.

In 1996 Étienne Daho called on him again, this time for his 1996 album Eden.

In 1997 Sabo played on Natalie Imbruglia's hit Grammy-winning RCA album Left of the Middle and toured with Imbruglia supporting it.

21st century
In 2000, Sabo played on XTC's final studio album, Wasp Star (Apple Venus Volume 2). His work the following year included Jimmy Nail's album Ten Great Songs and an OK Voice, and a return engagement with Imbruglia for her second album, White Lilies Island.

The success of the Natalie Imbruglia project and others enabled Sabo and his then-wife Jeanette Landry to set up a home studio, where among other projects they wrote and recorded with singer Sally Ann Marsh, who was later signed to Jive Records. Her success led them to a publishing deal with Dalmatian Songs in the U.K. and with BMG in the rest of the world.

In 2007 he joined the drum faculty of the Institute of Contemporary Music Performance in London.

In 2019 he released three singles, "This Cowboy Ain't Going Home," "The Politician," and "Keep Running Forever," in advance of his forthcoming debut album Running the Human Race and a single ("Dark & Rainy Street") co-produced by Chris Thomas.

Select discography

Collaborations 
With David Knopfler
 1986 Cut the Wire

With Michel Polnareff
 1990 Kāma-Sūtra

With Elton John
 1993 Duets

With Marcella Detroit
 1994 Jewel
 1996 Feeler

With Natalie Imbruglia
 1997 Left of the Middle
 2001 White Lilies Island
 2005 Counting Down the Days

With Ronan Keating
 2000 Ronan

With Melanie C
 2012 Stages

References 

1958 births
Living people
American rock drummers
American session musicians
Musicians from Allentown, Pennsylvania
20th-century American drummers
American male drummers
20th-century American male musicians